{{Taxobox
| name = Marinobacterium profundum
| domain = Bacteria
| phylum = Pseudomonadota
| classis = Gammaproteobacteria
| ordo = Alteromonadales
| familia = Alteromonadaceae
| genus = Marinobacterium
| species = M. profundum| binomial = Marinobacterium profundum| binomial_authority = Hwang et al. 2016
| type_strain = JCM 30410, KCCM 43095, PAMC 27536
| subdivision = 
| synonyms = 
}}Marinobacterium profundum'  is a Gram-negative, rod-shaped and motile bacterium from the genus of Marinobacterium'' which has been isolated from deep-sea sediments from the Sea of Japan in Korea.

References

External links
Type strain of Marinobacterium profundum at BacDive -  the Bacterial Diversity Metadatabase

 

Alteromonadales
Bacteria described in 2016